Valet boy is a term used in some countries to refer to young people who ask for fees from those who park at the roadside. Valet boys usually work in groups, and demand an RM 1-5 "parking fee" from car owners, under an agreement that they will protect the car. It is these very same valets, however, who do the vandalizing should the driver refuse to pay.  This "protection" service is a form of extortion. The valet boys do not park the car for the owner; rather they direct drivers into parking lots. 
This practice has become common in large Brazilian cities, such as São Paulo and Rio de Janeiro, where numerous cases of "valet boys" vandalizing cars are reported every day. Similar schemes are also run in other countries although often the person is not a 'boy'. In the Philippines, however, this scheme is mostly run by street children.

In Indonesia, this practice has become very commonplace and generally accepted that the government hires local mob to collect parking fee. The revenue is usually shared for the local government and the mob.

See also
 Valet
 Valet de chambre
 Trapito
 Car guard
 Franelero

References

External links
 Encarta: definition of Jaga kereta
 Bangsar valet boys a nuisance
 `Jaga kereta', jockey menace in Bangsar

Transport in Malaysia
Informal occupations
Child labour
Parking
Extortion
Crimes
Illegal occupations
Organized crime activity
Property crimes